Matthew Philip Clucas (born 18 March 1978) is an Australian rules footballer. He played as a midfielder and began his football career at East Fremantle Football Club.

Fremantle career
He played 11 Australian Football League (AFL) games between 1997 and 1999. He was delisted at the end of the 2000 season.

WAFL career
Clucas played 26 games for East Fremantle, including their 1998 premiership side.

In 1999, all Fremantle listed players were allocated to play for South Fremantle in the WAFL, rather than their original WAFL team. Clucas played 19 games for South Fremantle, but returned to East Fremantle in 2000 when the single club allocation system was abolished.

After bring delisted by Fremantle at the end of the 2000 season, Clucas also left East Fremantle and rejoined South.  He won their best and fairest award in 2001 and was a member of South Fremantle's 2005 premiership winning team.

References

External links
 
 

1978 births
Living people
Fremantle Football Club players
East Fremantle Football Club players
South Fremantle Football Club players
Australian rules footballers from Western Australia